Yee Jee Tso (born March 10, 1975 in Hong Kong) is a Canadian actor.

Tso and his family emigrated to Canada when he was 6 months old. He grew up in a predominantly Jewish neighbourhood and booked his first role at age 15.

His television roles include The Commish, Highlander, Sliders (1995), and the 1996 Doctor Who telemovie, in which he played the character Chang Lee. His Doctor Who connection continued when he played the part of Doctor Goddard in the webcast Real Time produced by Big Finish Productions, the part of Major Jal Brant in the audio drama Excelis Decays in 2002 and the role of Warrant Officer Charlie Sato in 2011's Tales from the Vault, 2013's Mastermind and 2014's The Screaming Skull.

Roles include Jared Chan, a programming wizard opposite Natasha Henstridge in the sci-fi thriller TV movie Impact, released worldwide in spring 2009. In 2007 he played the part of child-devouring monster in the other-worldly horror film They Wait, featured at the Toronto Film Festival.

He has played recurring roles on both sides of the law, in three award-winning television series Da Vinci's Inquest, Da Vinci's City Hall, and Intelligence.

In 2001, he played Teddy Chin, a counter-culture computer genius, opposite Ryan Phillippe in the MGM feature film AntiTrust. His other credits include: a series regular on the award-winning Canadian show Madison; recurring roles in the hit sci-fi TV series Stargate: Atlantis and Sliders; and guest appearances in dozens of other films and TV shows. In 2009 he appeared in Ratko: The Dictator's Son as Nick.

Credits

Filmography

Audio dramas

References

External links

1975 births
Living people
Canadian male voice actors
Canadian male television actors
Canadian male actors of Chinese descent